Smithville Township is one of six townships within Brunswick County, North Carolina, United States. It is a part of the Myrtle Beach metropolitan area.

It is the site of the Brunswick Nuclear Generating Station.

See also 
 Brunswick Town
 Orton Plantation

References 

Townships in Brunswick County, North Carolina
Cape Fear (region)
Townships in North Carolina